Kiplimo is a name of Kenyan origin that stems from the name Limo and the prefix Kip-, meaning "son of". It may refer to:

Kiplimo Kimutai (born 1981), Kenyan half marathon runner
Abraham Kiplimo (born 1989), Ugandan Olympic long-distance runner
Jacob Kiplimo (born 2000), Ugandan Olympic long-distance runner and Junior World Cross Country winner
Jonathan Kiplimo Maiyo (born 1988), Kenyan long-distance track and marathon runner
Joseph Kiplimo (born 1988), Kenyan long-distance track runner
Nixon Kiplimo Chepseba (born 1990), Kenyan 1500 metres runner and 2011 Diamond League winner
Samuel Kiplimo Kosgei (born 1986), Kenyan road runner and former world record holder over 25K

Kalenjin names